Professor Anthony Justin Travers, better known as Tony Travers (born December 1953), is a British academic and journalist, specialising in issues affecting local government. He is the director of LSE London, a research group at the London School of Economics and Political Science, and before that was director of the Greater London Group, a research centre at LSE for the study of the government of London. Since 1998, Travers has been Director of LSE London, a research group evolved out of the Greater London Group, which is hosted by the Department of Geography and Environment of the London School of Economics and conducts research on the economic and social issues of the London region.

He contributes a regular column to the Local Government Chronicle and has also written for The Guardian, The Evening Standard, The Independent, the Financial Times and The Times. He has published a number of books on cities and government.

Travers has held a number of official posts. From 1992 to 1997, he was a member of the Audit Commission and between 1999 and 2004, he was a Senior Associate of the King's Fund. He has advised the House of Commons Education and Skills Select Committee and the Committee on the Office of the Deputy Prime Minister and is a member of the Chartered Institute of Public Finance and Accountancy. He was also a member of the Urban Task Force Working Group on Finance.

Selected publications

 Failure in British Government: The Politics of the Poll Tax (with David Butler and Andrew Adonis)
 Paying for Health, Education and Housing: How does the Centre Pull the Purse Strings (with Howard Glennerster and John Hills)
 The Politics of London: Governing the Ungovernable City
 London's Boroughs at 50

References

British male journalists
Living people
Place of birth missing (living people)
1953 births